Long Lost Lake Township is a township in Clearwater County, Minnesota, United States. The population was 43 at the 2010 census. The township was organized in 2005, having previously existed as a survey township and unorganized territory.

References

External links

Townships in Clearwater County, Minnesota
Townships in Minnesota